Prabhat Prakashan is an Indian publishing house. It was co-founded in 1958 by Shyam Sunder Agarwal. They publish books in English and Hindi languages. They are the first Indian publisher to bring out Hindi translations of Russian classics including the works of authors like Chekhov, Tolstoy and Gorky.

References

External links 

 Prabhat Prakashan
 Ocean Books

Printing companies of India
Book publishing in India
Book publishing company imprints
Publishing companies established in 1958
1958 establishments in Delhi
Book publishing companies of India
Companies based in New Delhi